Estonian Sumo Association (abbreviation ESA) is one of the sport governing bodies in Estonia which deals with sumo.

ESA is established in 1997. ESA is a member of International Sumo Federation (IFS) and Estonian Olympic Committee.

References

External links
 

Sports governing bodies in Estonia
1997 establishments in Estonia
Sports organizations established in 1997